Kazi Alauddin is a Bangladesh Jatiya Party politician and the former Member of Parliament of Satkhira-4.

Career
Alauddin was elected to parliament from Satkhira-4 as a Bangladesh Jatiya Party candidate in 2008.

References

Living people
People from Satkhira District
Bangladesh Jatiya Party politicians
8th Jatiya Sangsad members
Year of birth missing (living people)